Memphis, Tennessee is governed by a mayor and thirteen city council members. Since 1995, as a result of a legal challenge, all council members are elected from nine geographic districts. Seven are single-member districts and two have three representatives each.

City government
After being classified as a taxing district in 1880 after a grievous loss of population due to the yellow fever epidemic, Memphis regained home rule in 1893. It established a city commission form of government, which it maintained until 1968.

At that time, it established a mayor-council government of thirteen council positions. Six were elected at-large and seven were elected from single-member districts. Following implementation of the Voting Rights Act of 1965, African Americans began to register and vote in greater number.

Civil rights activists challenged the at-large voting structure for the city council, as it diluted the voting power of the minority and prevented their electing candidates of their choice. The at-large seats tended to be won by wealthier candidates who could mount citywide campaigns and command majority votes; in 1970, there was a substantial white majority.

In 1995 the city adopted a different electoral system, maintaining 13 seats on the council. Seven positions are elected from single-member districts, and two districts elect three representatives each. Since these changes, more Democrats and women have been elected to the city council than under the at-large system.

Memphis Mayor

Memphis mayors serve four-year terms. The current Mayor of Memphis is Jim Strickland, who was elected on October 8, 2015. Prior to his election as mayor, Strickland served as a Memphis city councilman. The previous mayor was A C Wharton.

Former mayor W.W. Herenton has been a formidable and controversial local political figure. At the time of his resignation he was serving his fourth consecutive term as Mayor. He was elected for the first time in 1991 as the city's first elected African-American mayor. J.O. Patterson, Jr., had previously served as mayor on an interim basis, and is considered the first African American in the position. Prior to his election, Dr. Herenton served for 12 years as the superintendent of Memphis City Schools.

Consolidation efforts
In recent years, there has been discussion of the potential of a merger of Shelby County and Memphis into a metropolitan government, similar to that in Nashville.

Ford family
The African-American Ford family has been influential in politics in the city for generations. The senior members established a funeral home, and built a broad network in the black community. Their political prominence dates to the era of E.H. Crump in the early 20th century in Memphis and the state. The best-known member of this family is Harold Ford, Sr., who represented most of Memphis in the U.S. House from 1975 to 1997. He was succeeded by his son Harold Ford, Jr. who served from 1997 to 2007.

His brother, John, was also a politician, serving as a state senator for 30 years. In 2007 John Ford was convicted on federal bribery charges in the Tennessee Waltz scandal.

Congressional representation

The city of Memphis is split between two congressional districts.  The western three-fourths of the city, including downtown, is within the Ninth Congressional District, which has been represented by Democrat Steve Cohen since 2007. Cohen was the first white Democrat to represent a significant portion of Memphis in more than 40 years.  Previously, as mentioned above, the district had been held for 32 years by the Ford family—in the persons of Harold, Sr. and his son, Harold, Jr.  Harold, Jr. gave up the seat to make an unsuccessful run for the United States Senate seat being vacated by Bill Frist.

The eastern fourth of the city is in the 8th District, represented by Republican David Kustoff. From 1973 to 2013, this area had been part of the 7th District (numbered as the 6th District from 1973 to 1983).

The district lines reflect intertwined racial and political polarization in the Memphis area.  The 9th is a heavily Democratic, majority-black district and is considered one of the most Democratic districts in the South; it has a Cook Partisan Voting Index of D+25. In contrast, the 8th is a heavily Republican district with a strong tinge of social conservatism. Eastern Shelby County is reckoned as the most Republican area of the state outside of the state's traditional Republican heartland of East Tennessee; the area's conservative white voters began splitting their tickets as early as the 1950s and switched parties outright in the late 1960s. When eastern Shelby County was moved from the 7th to the 8th as a result of redistricting in 2013, it turned the 8th into one of the most Republican districts in the nation; it has a PVI of R+19.

Memphis City Beautiful Commission
Established in 1930, the Memphis City Beautiful Commission is the oldest beautification project in the United States.

References

 
Memphis metropolitan area